Antigoni Psychrami, commonly spelled as Antigoni Psihrami, is a Greek singer who rose to fame after her participation on the first season of the talent show Greek Idol in 2010. She subsequently released the digital single "Xamogela". In March 2011, she was one of six candidates who competed to represent Greece in the Eurovision Song Contest 2011, competing with a song titled "It's All Greek to Me".

Eurovision 2011

"It's All Greek to Me!"

Antigoni Psychrami chose the song "It's All Greek to Me!" in an attempt to represent Greece at the 2011 Eurovision. "It's All Greek to Me!" was written by Apostolos Psihramis, with lyrics by Dimitris S. and Gerard James Borg. Borg is best known for penning five entries for Malta for Eurovision competitions. The song is performed in English, and is dance-pop in style, with ethnic elements. Psychrami emerged from the first season of the reality talent show Greek Idol in 2010, and promptly signed with record label Minos EMI. Antigoni's song finished in 2nd place, after Luca's "Watch my dance", which represented Greece in the Eurovision Song Contest 2011

Crimea Music Fest 2011
On 8 September 2011, Psychrami represented Greece on Crimea Music Fest, in Ukraine. The Crimea Music Fest is a worldwide song contest organized by Ukraine Television and Radio Programme. Psychrami reached 4th place for Greece at the fest.

Appearances

Chart positions and certifications

Rent
Psychrami played the role of Mimi Márquez in Rent The Musical.

CR Radio
Antigoni Psychrami and her friend Nicole Paparistodimou have their own radio program on Web Radio Station C R Radio. The program is named "Sigatikoi stin Trela"(English: Crazy roommates).

Personal life 

She hails from Myrkinos, Serres.

References 

21st-century Greek women singers
Living people
1987 births
People from Serres